Shigatse Tingri Airport is an under-construction high-altitude airport in Tingri County, Xigazê, Tibet Autonomous Region. Construction began in August 2019.

References 

Proposed airports in China